Leysera is a genus of African flowering plants in the tribe Gnaphalieae within the family Asteraceae.

 Species
 Leysera callicornia Gaertn.
 Leysera gnaphalodes (L.) L.
 Leysera gnaphaloides Thunb.
 Leysera leyseroides (Desf.) Maire
 Leysera tenella DC.

References

Gnaphalieae
Asteraceae genera
Flora of Africa